Voroklini, more commonly and unofficially known as Oroklini, is a village in Larnaca District, Cyprus, to the north-east of Larnaca. Its population in 2011 was 6,134, and is mainly divided between Cypriot and British residents. 

Oroklini refers mainly to the village behind Oroklini Lake, however, some coastal neighborhoods in Livadia and on Dhekelia Road are usually also designated as outskirts of Oroklini.

History 
The region around the village was inhabited in ancient times, when there was intense mining in that region, especially for copper. It was an estate of despots, and was probably destroyed by Saracens. Leontios Machairas in his Chronicle mentions raids by the Saracens in that region during the reign of Janus of Cyprus (1398-1432). Oroklini and the surrounding villages were abandoned in the fifteenth century, resettled, then again temporarily abandoned before being resettled in the sixteenth century. 
In the seventeenth century it is mentioned in Venetian documents as Vorochini: during this period the village was abandoned yet again. It was finally permanently settled in the eighteenth century.

Industry 
Although copper is no longer mined, there are a number of quarries of grey soil, umber and tera alba.

Bird protection area  
Oroklini Lake is designated as a Special Protection Area (SPA) and was subject to a three-year project starting in January 2012 to bring the lake to ″favourable conservation status″. Black-winged stilt (Himantopus himantopus) and the spur-winged lapwing (Vanellus spinosus) were the main target species along with fifty-eight bird species that migrate through, or overwinter within the SPA. The shallow salt lakes are also home to greater flamingo. The lake has also been designated an Important Bird Area (IBA) by BirdLife International.

Churches
There are several deserted chapels in the area next to the mountainside. The old small church of the Archangel Michael from the 17th century is built in the Byzantine style. It was rebuilt in 1867. The new church of the Archangel Michael was built in 1986.
The small church of the Prophet Elias was built in the 16th century on the hilltop west of the village. There was also the Church of Saint Thomas, which was a monastery from the 10th century.

References

Communities in Larnaca District
Protected areas of Cyprus
Important Bird Areas of Cyprus